The Fowlersville Covered Bridge is a historic wooden covered bridge located in North Centre Township in Columbia County, Pennsylvania. It originally crossed West Branch Briar Creek. In 1986 the bridge was moved to Briar Creek Park in North Centre Township. Coodinates the bridge's current location appear at the end of the article. It is one of 28 historic covered bridges in Columbia and Montour Counties.

It was listed on the National Register of Historic Places in 1979.

References 

Covered bridges on the National Register of Historic Places in Pennsylvania
Covered bridges in Columbia County, Pennsylvania
Bridges completed in 1886
Wooden bridges in Pennsylvania
Bridges in Columbia County, Pennsylvania
Relocated buildings and structures in Pennsylvania
National Register of Historic Places in Columbia County, Pennsylvania
Road bridges on the National Register of Historic Places in Pennsylvania
Queen post truss bridges in the United States